Ulugbek Bakayev (born 28 November 1978) is a former Uzbekistani footballer and current manager of FC Sogdiana Jizzakh.

Career
Bakayev played spent most of his career with Kazakhstan football clubs. Playing in the Kazakhstan Premier League, he scored a total of 111 goals (as of 12 July 2014) and became the league's top scorer four times . From 2012 to 2014 he played for Irtysh Pavlodar. In 2012, he became best goal scorer of League with 14 goals and was named Footballer of the Year in Kazakhstan. In August 2014 he signed a contract with his former club FK Buxoro. On 26 January 2017, he became head coach of FK Buxoro.

International
Bakayev was a member of the Uzbekistan national football team. At the 2011 Asian Cup he scored two goals against Jordan in a 2–1 win to put Uzbekistan into the semi-finals.
On 29 May 2014 in Tashkent, he played his farewell match for national team against Oman.

Honours

Club
Bunyodkor
Uzbek League: 2008
Uzbek Cup: 2008

Tobol
Kazakhstan Premier League: 2010
Kazakhstan Cup: 2007

Zhetysu
Kazakhstan Premier League runner-up: 2011

Irtysh Pavlodar
Kazakhstan Premier League runner-up: 2012
Kazakhstan Cup: 2012

National team
AFC Asian Cup 4th place: 2011

Individual
Kazakhstan Premier League Top Scorer (4): 2004, 2010, 2011, 2012
Kazakhstan Premier League Best Player (Almaz award) (2): 2011, 2012
Kazakhstani Footballer of the Year: 2012

References

External links

Ulugbek Bakaev at Footballdatabase

1978 births
Living people
People from Bukhara
Uzbekistani footballers
Uzbekistani expatriate footballers
Uzbekistan international footballers
PFC CSKA Moscow players
FC Moscow players
Expatriate footballers in Kazakhstan
Expatriate footballers in Russia
Expatriate footballers in the United Arab Emirates
FC Bunyodkor players
FC Tobol players
Dubai CSC players
Uzbekistani expatriate sportspeople in Kazakhstan
Uzbekistani expatriate sportspeople in Russia
2007 AFC Asian Cup players
2011 AFC Asian Cup players
Russian Premier League players
Buxoro FK players
FK Dinamo Samarqand players
FC Irtysh Pavlodar players
FC Zhetysu players
Kazakhstan Premier League players
UAE Pro League players
Association football forwards
Uzbekistan Super League players
FC Neftekhimik Nizhnekamsk players
Uzbekistani expatriate sportspeople in the United Arab Emirates